James Joseph Barbour (December 28, 1869 – March 29, 1946) was an American politician and lawyer.

Biography
Barbour was born in Hartford, Connecticut. He worked in the newspaper business and was involved in public speaking in Camden, New Jersey. He studied law in a law office in Chicago, Illinois and at Lake Forest University. Barbour was admitted to the Illinois bar in 1891. He practiced law in Evanston, Illinois. Barbour served in the Illinois Senate from 1917 to 1937 and was a Republican. Barbour then served in the Illinois House of Representatives from 1941 to 1943. Barbour died from heart disease in Evanston, Illinois.

References

1869 births
1946 deaths
Politicians from Hartford, Connecticut
People from Evanston, Illinois
Lake Forest College alumni
Illinois lawyers
Republican Party Illinois state senators
Republican Party members of the Illinois House of Representatives